= Ronald Jager =

Ronald Jager is an American professor and author. He was a professor of philosophy at Yale University, but left in his 40s to become a writer.

== Books ==
- The Fate of Family Farming: Variations on an American Idea
- Last House on the Road: Excursions Into a Rural Past
- Eighty Acres: Elegy for a Family Farm
- The Granite State: New Hampshire
- Portrait of a Hill Town: A History of Washington, N. H., 1876-1976 (1977)
- The Development of Bertrand Russell's Philosophy
- A Sacred Deposit: The Meetinghouse in Washington, N.H. with Sally Krone
- New Hampshire, An Illustrated History Of The Granite State
